Ruutu+ Leffat ja Sarjat (formerly Nelonen Prime, Nelonen Kino, KinoTV) is a Finnish television channel broadcasting movies and series. It is owned and operated by Nelonen.

Series 
This is a list of Ruutu+ Leffat ja Sarjat's foreign series.
 ER
 Isänmaan toivot
 Seinfeld
 That '70s Show
 The Hollywood Reporter
 Hannibal

External links
Official website 

Television channels and stations established in 2007
Television channels in Finland